Olari is an Estonian given name and a surname. Notable persons with that name include:

People with the given name
Olari Elts (born 1971), Estonian conductor
Olari Taal (born 1953), Estonian businessman and politician

People with the surname
Andrei Olari, Russian rugby league player
Silvia Olari (born 1988), Italian singer

References

Estonian masculine given names